Jacob J. "Jake" Krull, Jr. (December 23, 1938 – November 25, 2016) was an American military officer and South Dakota politician. He served in the South Dakota Senate from 1973 to 1983 and was a Democrat.

Background
Born in Watertown, South Dakota, Krull served in the United States Army and the South Dakota National Guard. He graduated from Watertown High School in 1956 and from South Dakota State University in 1960. He worked in the insurance business. Krull died in Watertown, South Dakota.

References

1938 births
2016 deaths
People from Watertown, South Dakota
South Dakota State University alumni
Businesspeople from South Dakota
Democratic Party South Dakota state senators
United States Army generals
South Dakota National Guard personnel
20th-century American businesspeople